Zhou Guozhi (born March 1937) is a Chinese material scientist and physical chemist. He is an academician with the Chinese Academy of Sciences (CAS), and a professor of material science and engineering in Shanghai University.

References 

1937 births
Living people
Chemists from Jiangsu
Chinese materials scientists
Chinese physical chemists
Educators from Nanjing
Members of the Chinese Academy of Sciences
Physicists from Jiangsu
Scientists from Nanjing
Academic staff of Shanghai University
Academic staff of the University of Science and Technology Beijing